Hoseynabad (also Romanized as Ḩoseynābād; also known as Ḩoseynābād-e Karvan and Husainābād) is a village in Karvan-e Sofla Rural District, Karvan District, Tiran and Karvan County, Isfahan Province, Iran. At the 2006 census, its population was 1,166, in 319 families.

References 

Populated places in Tiran and Karvan County